General Justo José de Urquiza Airport  is located on the southeast side of Paraná, a city in the Entre Ríos Province of Argentina. The airport is named for Justo José de Urquiza, president of the Argentine Confederation from 1854 to 1860.

The Argentine Air Force Second Air Brigade, Paraná is based on the north side of the airport, while the public terminal facilities are on the west side.

Airlines and destinations

Statistics

See also

Transport in Argentina
List of airports in Argentina

References

External links
FallingRain - General Urquiza Airport

Airports in Argentina